Grofit (lit. Shoot (of a plant)) is a kibbutz in southern Israel. Located near Eilat in the Arabah region, it falls under the jurisdiction of Hevel Eilot Regional Council.

History
The community was founded in 1963 as a Nahal settlement and is named after the Arabic name of the nearby Grofit Creek. In 1966 the kibbutz was settled by adults who had been members of the HaNoar HaOved VeHaLomed youth movement.

Notable people
Moshe Ya'alon, Chief of Staff of the IDF from 2002 to 2005

References

External links
Official website  

Kibbutzim
Kibbutz Movement
Populated places established in 1963
Nahal settlements
Populated places in Southern District (Israel)
1963 establishments in Israel